Xonrupt-Longemer is a commune in the Vosges department in Grand Est in northeastern France.

Its inhabitants are called .

Geography 

The commune is located in the upper valley of the Vologne river, that goes up to the Schlucht mountain pass.

It is one of 188 communes in the Ballons des Vosges Nature Park.

Points of interest
Jardin d'altitude du Haut Chitelet.
 ("Fairies bridge"), built in the 18th century.
, with a bell from 1650.

Population

See also
Communes of the Vosges department

References

Communes of Vosges (department)
Vosges communes articles needing translation from French Wikipedia